Roy's Got Rhythm is an album by American jazz trumpeter Roy Eldridge featuring tracks recorded in Sweden in 1951 and released on the EmArcy label. The album was originally recorded for the Swedish label Metronome, and some cuts were also released on Prestige Records.

Reception

Allmusic awarded the album 4 stars with its review by Scott Yanow stating: "Between his Paris sessions of 1950 and 1951 for Vogue, trumpeter Roy Eldridge traveled to Sweden and recorded nine spirited selections for Metronome which were reissued on this EmArcy LP. None of Eldridge's sidemen (except for clarinetist Ove Lind who is just on two songs) gained much of a reputation outside of Sweden, but they fare well during these fairly basic performances which are based in swing but also influenced a little by early rhythm & blues".

Track listing
All compositions by Roy Eldridge except as indicated
 "Scotty" (George Duvivier) - 3:02
 "No Rolling Blues" (John Collins) - 3:06
 "The Heat's On" - 3:02
 "Saturday Nite Fish Fry Part 1" (Louis Jordan, Ellis Walsh) - 2:24
 "Saturday Nite Fish Fry Part 2" (Jordon, Walsh) - 2:34
 "Hoppin' John"  (Collins) - 3:09
 "They Raided the Joint" - 3:15
 "School Days" (Will Cobb, Gus Edwards) - 2:58
 "Echos of Harlem" (Duke Ellington) - 2:47
 "Roy's Got Rhythm" - 3:26
Recorded in Stockholm, Sweden on January 20 (3-5, 8 & 9), January 22 (tracks 2, 7 & 10) and January 29 (tracks 1 & 6), 1951

Personnel 
Roy Eldridge - trumpet, vocals
Leppe Sundevall - bass trumpet (tracks 3-5 & 8)
Ove Lind - clarinet (tracks 1 & 6)
Carl-Henrik Norin - tenor saxophone (tracks 3-5 & 8)
Charles Norman - piano, harpsichord
Gunnar Almstedt (tracks 1 & 6), Thore Jederby (tracks 2-5 & 7-10) - bass
Anders Burman - drums

References 

1955 albums
Roy Eldridge albums
EmArcy Records albums